The 1929 Auburn Tigers football team represented Auburn University in the 1929 college football season.

Schedule

References

Auburn
Auburn Tigers football seasons
Auburn Tigers football